The 2018 Supercopa Uruguaya was the first edition of the Supercopa Uruguaya, Uruguay's football super cup. It was held on 26 January 2018 between 2017 Torneo Intermedio winners Nacional and 2017 Primera División champions Peñarol. It was originally scheduled to be played on 28 January, however, and due to Nacional's first match in the 2018 Copa Libertadores being scheduled on 31 January, the Supercopa was moved to 26 January.

The match was played at Estadio Centenario in Montevideo. Peñarol were the winners after beating Nacional 3–1 in normal time.

Teams

Match details

References

Supercopa Uruguaya
2018 in Uruguayan football
s
s
January 2018 sports events in South America